Anton Koolmann (11 September 1899–v 29 June 1953) was a wrestler and coach from Kuusalu Parish, Estonia who took part at the 1924 Summer Olympics in Paris, France.

Career
1924 after winning Estonian Greco-Roman wrestling championships he participated at the 1924 Summer Olympics in Paris, France:

Men's Greco-Roman bantamweight (-58 kg)
 First round– defeated French champion Georges Appruzeze  by fall 13min 10s.
 Second round– lost to 1932 Summer Olympics champion Giovanni Gozzi  with points.
 Third round– lost to 1921 world champion and later  Bronze medalist Väinö V. Ikonen  with points. (→ did not advance, 13.-16. place)
Men's freestyle featherweight (-61 kg)  
 1/8 Final round– lost to later  Gold medalist Robin Reed 
 Tournament to 2nd place - First round– lost to later  Silver medalist Chester Newton . (→ did not advance, 10. place)

After Olympics he didn't return to home, but arrived, according to The Estonian Archives in Australia (EAA), 16 February 1925 from Campbeltown to Adelaide, Australia on the four-masted Barque "Carthpool" (Sister ship of Lawhill).

In Australia within the first fortnight of his career as a professional wrestler Koolmann won in seven successive championship matches, two state championships, three Victorian and two Australasian amateur championships.
He won Australian middleweight championstitle from Hughie Whitman.

15 October 1928 he moved to New Zealand and got citizenship in 1933.

1934 he wrestled against former NWA World Heavyweight Champion Gus "The Goat" Sonnenberg.

In the late 1930s, he trained many New Zealand wrestling champions in his Koolman's Gym in Wellington. Among them Ernie "Kiwi" Kingston and from 1951 Maori professional heavyweight wrestler Keita Meretana of Wairoa.

He died suddenly in his home at age 53 in Wellington, New Zealand.

Sport achievements

References
 
 A little piece of San Francisco in Wellington! - former Koolman's Wrestling Gym in 171 Cuba Street, Wellington

External links
 Koolman's Correct Wrestling - Plates 45-48, series reprinted from an early wrestling book
 Koolman's Correct Wrestling - Plates 57 and 58
 Four-masted barque "Carthpool"
 Anton Koolmann`s descendants
 Family business
 
 
 

1899 births
1953 deaths
Olympic wrestlers of Estonia
People from Kuusalu Parish
New Zealand male sport wrestlers
Wrestlers at the 1924 Summer Olympics
Estonian male sport wrestlers
Estonian emigrants to New Zealand
Sportspeople from Wellington City